List of Italian football transfers 2006–07 may refer to:
 List of Italian football transfers summer 2006 (co-ownership)
 List of Italian football transfers summer 2006 (July)
 List of Italian football transfers summer 2006 (August)
 List of Italian football transfers winter 2006–07